All God's Children may refer to:

 "All God's Children" (song), a song by Belinda Carlisle
 All God's Children (1996 film), a 1996 LGBT-related documentary
 All God's Children (2012 film), a 2012 Moldovan film
 All Gods Children (book), a book about cults by Carroll Stoner and Jo Anne Parke
 "All God's Children", a story by Irma Berk and William Rowland, basis for the 1960 film This Rebel Breed
 All God's Children: The Bosket Family and the American Tradition of Violence, a 1995 book about Willie Bosket and his family by Fox Butterfield

See also 
 God's Children (disambiguation)
 All God's Chillun Got Wings (disambiguation)
 "All God's Chillun Got Rhythm", a 1937 jazz standard
 All God's Children Need Traveling Shoes (1986), by Maya Angelou